Morgan Reece Whittaker (born 7 January 2001) is an English professional footballer who plays for Championship club Swansea City.

Whittaker began his playing career at Derby County's academy before making his senior debut for the club in August 2019.

Club career

Derby County
On 12 August 2019, Whittaker made his professional debut as an 87th-minute substitute in the EFL Cup for Derby County against Scunthorpe United and made his first start in a 3–0 defeat away to Nottingham Forest in the same competition. He signed a new contract with Derby running until June 2023 on 22 January 2020. Whittaker finished the season with three starts and eighteen substitute appearances and scored his first career goal with the second Derby goal in a 3–1 win away to Birmingham City on the final day.

Whittaker started the 2020–21 season by scoring the winning-penalty in a 3–2 shootout victory over Barrow in the EFL Cup and continued making frequent substitute appearances throughout the course of the season.

Swansea City
On 1 February 2021, Whittaker joined fellow Championship side Swansea City on a four-and-a-half year deal. Nine days later, Whittaker scored on his debut for the Swans in a 1–3 home defeat by Premier League side Manchester City in the FA Cup. His first league goal came on 1 May 2021 in the penultimate game of the season to equalise in an eventual 2–1 victory over Derby County that kept his former side firmly in the relegation battle.

On 24 August 2021, Whittaker scored a hat-trick in a 4–1 win over Plymouth Argyle in the second round of the EFL Cup. It was the first hat-trick scored by a Swansea player since Scott Sinclair in the 2011 Championship play-off final.

Lincoln City (loan)
On 1 January 2022, Whittaker joined Lincoln City on loan for the remainder of the season. He made his debut against Oxford United on 8 January 2022, starting and scoring in the game.

Plymouth Argyle (loan)
On 20 July 2022, Whittaker joined Plymouth Argyle on a season-long loan deal. Having scored three vital goals and claiming an assist across September 2022, Whittaker was awarded the EFL League One Player of the Month Award with Argyle sitting top of the league.

International career
Having represented England at U16 to U18 level, Whittaker made his U19 debut on 9 September 2019 during a 1–0 defeat to Germany in Haiger.

On 13 October 2020, Whittaker made his debut for the England U20s during a 2–0 victory over Wales at St. George's Park.

Career statistics

Honours
Individual
EFL League One Player of the Month: September 2022

References

2001 births
Living people
Footballers from Derby
English footballers
Association football forwards
English Football League players
Derby County F.C. players
Swansea City A.F.C. players
Lincoln City F.C. players
Plymouth Argyle F.C. players